Monarch Airlines served the following destinations at the time when it ceased operations in October 2017.

Europe
Austria
Innsbruck – Innsbruck Airport Seasonal
Salzburg – Salzburg Airport Seasonal

Croatia
Dubrovnik – Dubrovnik Airport Seasonal
Split - Split Airport Seasonal
Zagreb – Zagreb Airport

Cyprus
Larnaca – Larnaca Airport
Paphos – Paphos Airport Seasonal

Finland
Kittilä – Kittilä Airport Seasonal

France
Lyon – Lyon–Saint-Exupéry Airport Seasonal
Grenoble – Grenoble-Isère Airport Seasonal
Nice – Côte d'Azur Airport Seasonal

Germany
Friedrichshafen – Friedrichshafen Airport Seasonal

Gibraltar
Gibraltar International Airport

Greece
Heraklion – Heraklion Airport Seasonal
Preveza – Aktion National Airport Seasonal 
Rhodes – Rhodes International Airport Seasonal

Italy
Naples – Naples International Airport Seasonal
Rome – Rome Fiumicino Airport
Turin – Turin Airport Seasonal
Venice – Venice Marco Polo Airport Seasonal
Verona – Verona Airport Seasonal

Portugal
Faro – Faro Airport
Madeira – Madeira Airport
Lisbon – Lisbon Airport
Porto – Porto Airport 

Spain
Alicante – Alicante Airport
Almería – Almería Airport 
Barcelona – Barcelona Airport
Fuerteventura – Fuerteventura Airport
Ibiza – Ibiza Airport Seasonal
Lanzarote – Arrecife Airport
Las Palmas de Gran Canaria – Gran Canaria Airport
Madrid – Adolfo Suárez Madrid–Barajas Airport Seasonal
Málaga – Málaga Airport
Menorca – Menorca Airport Seasonal
Palma de Mallorca – Son Sant Joan Airport Seasonal
Tenerife – Tenerife South Airport
Valencia - Valencia Airport Seasonal

Sweden
Stockholm – Arlanda Airport 

Switzerland
Geneva - Geneva Airport Seasonal

Turkey
Antalya - Antalya Airport Seasonal
Dalaman – Dalaman Airport Seasonal

United Kingdom
Birmingham – Birmingham Airport Base
Leeds/Bradford – Leeds Bradford International Airport Base
London – London Gatwick Airport Base
London – London Luton Airport Base
Manchester – Manchester Airport Base

Middle East
Israel
Tel Aviv – Ben Gurion Airport
Eilat – Ovda Airport Seasonal

Terminated destinations prior to cessation of operations

Africa
Egypt - Hurghada, Luxor, Sharm el-Sheikh, Taba
Gambia - Banjul
Ghana - Accra
Kenya - Mombasa
Morocco - Agadir
Tunisia - Monastir, Enfidha
Americas
Barbados - Bridgetown
Grenada - St. George's
Jamaica - Montego Bay
Mexico - Cancún
Trinidad & Tobago - Tobago
United States - Bangor for fuel stop, Orlando International, Orlando-Sanford, Las Vegas
Venezuela - Porlamar
Asia
Sri Lanka - Colombo
India - Goa
Maldives - Male
Europe
Bulgaria - Burgas, Sofia
Croatia - Pula
France - Bordeaux
Germany - Munich
Greece - Corfu, Kavala, Kefalonia, Kos, Mytilene, Santorini, Skiathos, Volos, Zakynthos
Ireland - Cork, Dublin, Knock, Shannon
Italy - Catania, Lamezia Terme, Milan-Malpensa
Malta - Malta
Turkey - Bodrum
Spain - Granada, Jerez, Murcia
United Kingdom - Aberdeen, Blackpool, Bristol, Durham Tees Valley, East Midlands, Edinburgh, Glasgow, Liverpool, London-Stansted, Newcastle upon Tyne, Newquay

External links

References 

Lists of airline destinations